The Way I'm Made is the first studio album by Canadian country music singer Adam Gregory, released on May 23, 2000, by Epic Records. It has since been certified Gold by the CRIA for sales of 50,000 copies. The album earned Gregory a Prairie Music Award for Outstanding Country Music Recording in September 2001.

Track listing

 "Only Know I Do" (Jamie Houston, David C. Martin) – 3:37
 "Horseshoes" (Ben Dunk, Martin, Memphis) – 3:14
 "No Vacancy" (Martin) – 3:28
 "Big Star" (Hal Draper) – 3:58
 "City Boy's Dream" (Memphis) – 3:59
 "The Way I'm Made" (Martin) – 4:30
 "Facts of Life" (Houston, Martin) – 3:28
 "Half Past Loving You" (Martin) – 3:08
 "Too Young to Know" (Jason Levine, James McCollum) – 3:40
 "It Ain't Cool" (Clif Magness, Martin, Chris Waters) – 3:55
 "The Ring" (Draper, David Quilco) – 2:49
 "The Sky Is the Limit" (Adam Gregory) – 2:59
 "Leavin' That Cowgirl with the Blues" (Martin) – 3:34

Personnel
 Mike Brignardello – bass guitar
 Larry Byrom – acoustic guitar
 Dan Dugmore – electric guitar, steel guitar
 Larry Franklin – fiddle
 Adam Gregory – lead vocals
 John Hobbs – keyboards
 Jamie Houston – background vocals
 Jeff King – electric guitar
 Paul Leim – drums
 Brian Leonard – percussion
 Brent Mason – acoustic guitar, electric guitar
 Mark Sterling – dobro, acoustic guitar, background vocals
 Lonnie Wilson – drums

Chart performance

Year-end charts

References

External links
[ allmusic ((( The Way I'm Made > Overview )))]

2000 debut albums
Adam Gregory albums
Epic Records albums